"Half the Way" is a song written by Ralph Murphy and Bobby Wood, and recorded by American country music artist Crystal Gayle.  It was released in September 1979 as the first single from the album Miss the Mississippi.

After achieving major Country crossover success in 1977 with "Don't It Make My Brown Eyes Blue.", followed by a Top 20 Pop hit and No. 1 Country hit the next year ("Talking In Your Sleep"), Gayle attempted this new crossover piece of music.

After signing with Columbia Records in early 1979, Gayle immediately started recording for them. "Half the Way" was the first song recorded under her new record label. The song's up-tempo sound and Soft Rock-sounding melody, made the song reach Billboard's Top 20 chart, and even reaching the Top 15, peaking at No. 15 in 1979. The song also climbed to Billboard Magazine's No. 2 position on the Country charts, just missing the top spot. Like Gayle's other previous recordings, the song also hit the Adult Contemporary chart. "Half the Way" is one of Gayle's better-known Adult Contemporary hits, reaching the Top 10 at No. 9. Following "Half the Way"'s success, Gayle never achieved another Top 40 Pop hit on her own again. Her singles did chart outside the Pop Top 40 though following this, and also the Adult Contemporary chart.

Chart performance

References

External links
 

1979 singles
1979 songs
Crystal Gayle songs
Songs written by Ralph Murphy (musician)
Song recordings produced by Allen Reynolds
Columbia Records singles
Songs written by Bobby Wood (songwriter)